Jamali is a surname and tribe mainly located in Balochistan and Sindh, Pakistan. They are also found in the Middle Eastern countries.

Notable people with the surname include:

Badr al-Jamali, Statesman, missionary and military chief of the Fatimid Caliphate, Cairo
Fakhreddin Jamali (born 1945), Iranian-Canadian professor of pharmacy and pharmaceutical sciences at the University of Alberta
Jan Mohammad Jamali, politician from Jaffarabad, Balochistan, Pakistan
Manuchehr Jamali, Iranian philosopher
Muhammad Fadhel al-Jamali, former Prime Minister of Iraq
Rosa Jamali, Iranian poet and playwright
Taj Muhammad Jamali, former Chief Minister of Balochistan, Pakistan
Zafarullah Khan Jamali, former Prime Minister of Pakistan
Rafiq Ahmed Jamali, chairman Gorakh Hills Station Development Authority (GHSDA), Sindh, Pakistan

See also
Jamali (given name)

References

Surnames
Baloch tribes
Sindhi tribes
Ethnic groups in Pakistan